Stephen Hunter McCooke (4 September 1918 – 16 March 2007) was a British long-distance runner. He competed in the men's 10,000 metres at the 1948 Summer Olympics.

References

1918 births
2007 deaths
Athletes (track and field) at the 1948 Summer Olympics
British male long-distance runners
Olympic athletes of Great Britain
Place of birth missing